The Dubai International Financial Centre (DIFC) is a special economic zone in Dubai covering , established in 2004 as a financial hub for companies operating throughout the Middle East, Africa and South Asia (MEASA) markets. DIFC is regulated by the Dubai Financial Services Authority, an independent regulator exclusive to the zone, and by its own court system, DIFC Courts, separate from the Emirate of Dubai's legal system and that of the federal government of the UAE. DIFC follows the common law framework and operates in English. The freezone houses financial institutions, and wealth funds in addition to retail and hotel space dedicated to the free zones.

DIFC is one of Dubai's independent free-zones; it offers companies 100% ownership without the need for a local partner. DIFC offers clients a 50-year guarantee of zero taxes on corporate income and profits, complemented by the UAE's network of double taxation treaties.

Independent jurisdiction
The DIFC is an independent jurisdiction under the Constitution of the United Arab Emirates, with its own civil and commercial laws distinct from those of the wider UAE, and its own courts. DIFC laws and regulations are written in English and default to English law in the event of an ambiguity. The DIFC Courts have judges from other common law jurisdictions including England, Singapore, Hong Kong and, previously, from Ireland. The DIFC's independent jurisdiction extends to a range of areas including corporate, commercial, civil, employment, trusts, and securities law matters. Other laws of the UAE or the Emirate of Dubai, such as criminal law and immigration regulations, continue to apply within the DIFC.

The DIFC-LCIA Arbitration Centre is an independent centre of international arbitration that uses rules modelled on the London Court of International Arbitration.

The principal governing body of the DIFC is the DIFC Authority. The financial services regulator is the Dubai Financial Services Authority (DFSA), which regulates the conduct of financial services in and from the DIFC. The DFSA is distinct from the UAE's federal Securities and Commodities Authority, whose jurisdiction covers the wider UAE outside the boundaries of the DIFC.

The DIFC court witnessed Lord (Angus) Glennie being sworn in as a judge in the presence of Sheikh Mohammed bin Rashid al-Maktoum in 2021. A year later, in July 2022, the Scottish judge started facing criticism from retired barrister and former chair of human rights advocacy group, Amnesty International Ireland, Bill Shipsey, for turning a blind eye to the Emirates' "egregious human rights abuses". Lord Glennie started being criticised after the back to back resignations of former Irish judges from the DIFC court. Former Irish chief justice, Frank Clarke and former president of the High Court, Peter Kelly, resigned within days of being sworn in at the DIFC court following criticism from barrister and leader of the Labour Party, Ivana Bacik.

Financial trading
Licence applications are considered from financial institutions in the sectors. The units offer 0% tax on income and profits, 100% foreign ownership, no restrictions on foreign exchange or capital/profit repatriation, operational support and business continuity facilities.

One of the key elements of the centre is a privately held financial exchange that opened in September 2005 as Dubai International Financial Exchange (DIFX) but was rebranded as NASDAQ Dubai in 2008. The trading hours of NASDAQ Dubai are from 10:00 am to 2:00 pm (06:00 am to 10:00 am GMT), from Sunday to Thursday. Companies listed on NASDAQ Dubai include ordinary shares listed by DP World along with DEPA. DP World's initial public offering was the largest ever in the Middle East and raised $4.96 billion; 15 times oversubscribed, it is one of the most valued companies in the Middle East Region.

DIFC FinTech Hive 
In April 2017, the DIFC announced its initiative to accelerate the growth of Financial Technology in the region. Arif Amiri, Chief Executive Officer at DIFC commented: 'FinTech Hive at DIFC will connect innovators in financial services technology with the banks, financial institutions and service providers within our dynamic ecosystem at DIFC'. The plan is for ten participating developers to present their products to venture capitalists. According to FinTech Middle East, DIFC FinTech Hive has played a significant role in the emerging financial technology market in the United Arab Emirates. Among the new players of the emerging market, the source noted Bridg, Democrance, Beehive and more. Technology partners Facebook and Envestnet | Yodlee have also been announced.

On 22 January 2020, DIFC FinTech hive announced the launch of a startup accelerator programme for fintech startups in Middle East Africa and South Asia (MEASA) region under the name 'FinTech Hive Scale Up Programme'.

Hotels
The Dubai International Financial Centre has three hotels, the Ritz-Carlton, the Waldorf Astoria, Four Seasons.

Art galleries
Dubai International Financial Centre is also home to several art galleries that showcase both local and foreign art.

Restaurants and cafés
There are over 100 cafes and restaurants located in the centre, featuring local and foreign chains with a variety of cuisines.

Shopping
Within the DIFC complex are located a variety of retail shops and convenience stores along with business services outlets. In 2018, the Gate Avenue shopping mall extension was opened to the public featuring an additional 185 retail, dining, fashion and lifestyle concepts.

Buildings
 DIFC Tower
 Emirates Financial Towers
 Sky Gardens
 The Index
 Park Towers

References

Economy of Dubai
Organisations based in Dubai
Office buildings in Dubai
Business parks of the United Arab Emirates
Free-trade zones of the United Arab Emirates